Terjola is a town in Imereti, Georgia, serving as an administrative center of the homonymous district.

Terjola is situated in the Imereti Lowlands in western Georgia, on the right bank of the Chkhara river. It lies on the Tbilisi-Zestaponi highway, 190 km northwest of Tbilisi and 14 km northwest of Zestaponi. Its population is 4,644.

Terjola is first mentioned in the 17th-century sources. It acquired the status of a town in 1983.

There are a series of historical and cultural landmarks in the environs of Terjola such as the Skande fortress, the ruins of the Gogni fort and church, and the Chkhalti church complex with its numerous antiquities now displayed in the museums of Georgia.

Notable natives 
 Mirian Giorgadze (born 1976), Greco-Roman wrestler

See also 
 List of cities and towns in Georgia (country)
 Imereti

References 

Cities and towns in Imereti
Populated places in Terjola Municipality
Kutaisi Governorate